Catherine "Caty" McNally (born November 20, 2001) is an American tennis player.
She achieved her career high WTA singles ranking of world No. 73 on 6 March 2023 and her best doubles ranking of world No. 11 on 4 April 2022. She has won seven doubles titles on the WTA Tour, three of them with Coco Gauff, and the pair also reached the final of the 2021 US Open. She reached another Major final at the 2022 US Open with Taylor Townsend. She has also won six doubles titles on the ITF Circuit.

In singles, McNally has also reached the third round of the 2020 US Open and has won one title on the WTA Challenger Tour plus two on the ITF Circuit.

She is best known for her doubles partnership with Coco Gauff, which is nicknamed "McCoco" by fans and media.

As a junior, McNally won the 2018 French Open doubles title, was runner-up in the 2018 French Open girls' singles, and won the US Open junior doubles competition.

Early life and background
McNally was born in Madeira, a suburb of Cincinnati, Ohio, to John McNally and Lynn Nabors-McNally, a graduate of Indian Hill High School. Her mother was briefly a professional tennis player who had a career best doubles ranking inside the top 250. Her older brother John is also a professional and was a high-ranked junior player. Both are coached by their mother.

Junior career
McNally finished runner-up at the Wimbledon junior doubles tournament in 2016, 2017 and 2018. She won her first Grand Slam junior title at the 2018 French Open doubles event at the age of 16, partnering with Iga Świątek. At the same tournament she reached the final of the girls singles, where she lost to Coco Gauff. In September 2018, she partnered Gauff to win the girls doubles title at the US Open.

In 2017, McNally was on the United States team that won the Junior Fed Cup, having previously been a losing finalist.

Professional career

2017–18: WTA Tour doubles debut
McNally made her WTA Tour main-draw debut at the 2017 Western & Southern Open in the doubles draw, partnering with Alexa Glatch.

2019: First singles wins; first doubles titles

In February 2019, McNally won the $100k Dow Tennis Classic. Later that month, she reached the third round of the Indian Wells Challenger, losing to eventual winner Viktorija Golubic. A week after that, she qualified for the Indian Wells Open, also in Indian Wells, beating Kristýna Plíšková and Timea Bacsinszky in the qualifiers. She earned a wildcard for the Miami Open, where she was again beaten by Coco Gauff. In July, she qualified for her first Grand Slam main-draw at Wimbledon.

At the end of July and beginning of August, McNally recorded her first WTA tournament main-draw singles wins with a run to the semifinal at the Washington Open, beating Zhu Lin, Christina McHale and fourth seed Hsieh Su-wei. Meanwhile, she and Gauff won the doubles competition, beating third seeds Miyu Kato and Anna Kalinskaya in the semifinal, and fourth seeds Maria Sanchez and Fanny Stollár in the final. She was awarded a wildcard into her home tournament, the Cincinnati Open, where she played her first-round match on center court, but lost to Elise Mertens. She teamed with up Alison Riske to play in the doubles. The pair reached the quarterfinals, beating fourth seeds Yifan Xu and Gabriela Dabrowski in a second round match that went to 17–15 in the match tiebreak, the second-longest match tiebreak in a women's doubles match.

McNally's first win in a major came at the US Open where she defeated Timea Bacsinszky in the first round. She took a set off six-times champion Serena Williams before losing in three sets in a tight second-round match. Passing her in the stadium complex later that night, Williams asked her: "Are you really 17 years old?" McNally and Gauff—dubbed "McCoco"—followed up their 2018 girls' doubles win by reaching the third round of the doubles event, beating ninth seeds Nicole Melichar and Kveta Peschke in the second round in a packed Louis Armstrong Stadium, but losing heavily to Ash Barty and Victoria Azarenka in the third. The run took McNally into the top 100 in the doubles rankings, and just outside the top 100 in the singles rankings.

She partnered Gauff again for the Linz Open, where they reached the semifinal. They were beaten by Barbara Haas and Xenia Knoll. At Luxembourg the following week, McNally lost in the first round to Jeļena Ostapenko, but went through to the final of the doubles with Gauff, beating Misaki Doi and Makoto Ninomiya, No. 4 seeds Anna Blinkova and Miyu Kato, and top-seeded pair of Kristýna Plíšková and Renata Voráčová. They beat second seeds Kaitlyn Christian and Alexa Guarachi in the final to secure their second WTA tournament title, with a career win–loss record of 12–2 as a team.

2020: Major quarterfinal & top 40 in doubles
In her first tournament of 2020, the Auckland Open, McNally was knocked out in the first round of the singles after qualifying as a lucky loser, but she and Gauff reached the semifinals of the doubles. At the Australian Open, she won her qualifying matches, entering the main draw, where she defeated Sam Stosur in the first round, before losing to Zhang Shuai. In doubles, McNally and Gauff recorded their best result at a Grand Slam tournament, reaching the quarterfinals before falling to second seeded Kristina Mladenovic and Tímea Babos in two sets. As a result, McNally broke into the top 40 in the doubles rankings. In March, she lost to Sachia Vickery in the first round of the Indian Wells Challenger tournament, but teamed up with Jessica Pegula to reach the final of the doubles, beating third seeds Stosur and Yanina Wickmayer in the semifinal before falling to Asia Muhammad and Taylor Townsend in the final.

Following the break caused by the COVID-19 pandemic, McNally took part in the Western & Southern Open, which was moved from her home town of Cincinnati to New York, losing in the first round to Alizé Cornet. The following week, she reached the third round of a Grand Slam tournament for the first time when she beat 21st seed Ekaterina Alexandrova in the second round of the US Open.

McNally made her World TeamTennis debut in 2020, playing for the Springfield Lasers.

2021: Major doubles final, doubles top 20
McNally reached her second consecutive doubles quarterfinal at the Australian Open, again playing with Gauff. They beat sixth seeds Gabriela Dabrowski and Bethanie Mattek-Sands, and ninth seeds Alexa Guarachi and Desirae Krawczyk, before falling to fourth seeds Nicole Melichar and Demi Schuurs. The pair then reached the quarterfinal of the Miami Open, beating second seeds Barbora Krejčíková and Kateřina Siniaková in the round of 16.

In April, McNally reached the third round of the Charleston Open, beating Elena Rybakina and Anastasija Sevastova in the first two rounds. In the one-off MUSC Health Open later that month, also in Charleston, she was beaten in the first round of the singles by Shelby Rogers, but partnered with Hailey Baptiste to win the doubles tournament, beating Australian duo Ellen Perez and Storm Sanders in the final. She won her second doubles title of the season the following month at the Emilia-Romagna Open, partnering Gauff, who also won the singles. In August, she lost to Sloane Stephens in the first round of the Silicon Valley Classic, but reached the semifinal of the doubles with CoCo Vandeweghe.

McNally received a wildcard entry to the US Open, but was beaten in the first round by fourth seed Karolína Plíšková. In the women's doubles, McNally and Gauff, who were seeded 11th, made their deepest run yet in a Grand Slam when they reached the semifinals without dropping a set, beating top seeds and current Wimbledon champions Hsieh Su-wei and Elise Mertens, in straight sets in the quarterfinals. They progressed to the final when their semifinal opponents, Luisa Stefani and Gabriela Dabrowski, retired after Stefani sustained an injury during the first set tiebreak. In the final, they lost to Sam Stosur and Zhang Shuai. The run to the final lifted McNally to No. 22 in the WTA doubles rankings.

2022: US Open final & top 15 in doubles, top 100 in singles

At the St. Petersburg Trophy in February, McNally teamed up with Anna Kalinskaya to win the doubles title, beating Polish Alicja Rosolska and New Zealander Erin Routliffe in the final; it was her fifth on the WTA Tour. The win took her to a career high No. 16 in the rankings on 14 February 2022.

She reached a second doubles final for the season with Kalinskaya at the Washington Open, defeating second seeded Belgian pair of world No. 1 in doubles, Elise Mertens, and Greet Minnen. They lost in the final to top seeded American Jessica Pegula and Erin Routliffe.

At the US Open, she and Taylor Townsend reached the doubles final, losing to Krejčíková and Siniaková. At the Ostrava Open the following month, she reached the quarterfinals of the singles before being beaten by Iga Świątek. In doubles, she teamed up with Alycia Parks for the first time. They were unseeded, but beat the first and fourth seeds en route to the final, where they beat third seeds Rosolska and Routliffe to win the title. It was McNally's sixth doubles title.

In November, she won the WTA 125 Midland Classic defeating Anna-Lena Friedsam in straight sets and made her top 100 debut in singles, at world No. 94 on 7 November 2022.

2023: Second WTA Tour semifinal and top 75 in singles
At the Mérida Open, she reached her first WTA Tour semifinal defeating third seed Zhu Lin, Katie Volynets and Kimberly Birrell. She lost to qualifier Rebecca Peterson. As a result, she reached the top 75, rising 17 positions. Playing with Diane Parry, she won her seventh doubles title, beating Wang Xinyu and Wu Fang-hsien in the final.

Performance timelines

Only main-draw results in WTA Tour, Grand Slam tournaments, Fed Cup/Billie Jean King Cup and Olympic Games are included in win–loss records.

Singles
Current after the 2023 Indian Wells Open.

Doubles
Current after the 2022 US Open.

Significant finals

Grand Slam tournaments

Doubles: 2 (2 runner-ups)

WTA career finals

Doubles: 10 (7 titles, 3 runner-ups)

WTA Challenger finals

Singles: 1 (title)

Doubles: 1 (runner-up)

ITF Circuit finals

Singles: 2 (2 titles)

Doubles: 8 (6 titles, 2 runner-ups)

Junior Grand Slam finals

Singles: 1 (runner-up)

Doubles: 5 (2 titles, 3 runner-ups)

ITF Junior Circuit finals

Singles: 5 (2 titles, 3 runner–ups)

Doubles: 15 (9 titles, 6 runner–ups)

Notes

References

External links
 
 

2001 births
Living people
American female tennis players
French Open junior champions
Tennis players from Cincinnati
Grand Slam (tennis) champions in girls' singles
Grand Slam (tennis) champions in girls' doubles
21st-century American women